Ust-Yansky District (Usuyaana uluuha) is an administrative and municipal district (raion, or ulus), one of the thirty-four in the Sakha Republic, Russia. It is located in the north of the republic in the Yana River delta on the coast of the Laptev Sea and borders with Allaikhovsky and Abyysky Districts in the east, Momsky District in the south, Verkhoyansky District in the southwest, and with Bulunsky District in the west. Its administrative center is the urban locality (a settlement) of Deputatsky. Population:  10,009 (2002 Census);  The population of Deputatsky accounts for 37.0% of the district's total population.

Geography
The main rivers in the district include the Yana, the Omoloy with the Ulakhan-Kyuegyulyur, the Sellyakh, as well as the Chondon with its tributary the Nuchcha. The Kyundyulyun, northernmost spur of the Chersky Range, rises north of Ust-Kuyga. There are numerous lakes in the district. Orotko is one of the largest. 

History
The district was established on January 5, 1967.

Demographics
As of the 1989 Census, the district had a population of 41,265 inhabitants, with an ethnic composition as follows:
Russians: 58.7%
Yakuts: 8.7%
Evens: 2.2%
Evenks: 0.1%
other ethnicities: 30.3%

However, a great deal of the ethnic Russian population left with the economic downturn following the collapse of the Soviet Union, so much so that the district lost over three-quarters of its population during the 1990s.  

In the 2010 census, the indigenous Yakuts again formed a majority of inhabitants, with the total population now just 8,262.  In that year, the ethnic composition of the district was:
Yakuts: 43.1%
Russians: 27.2%
Evens: 16.7%
Ukrainians: 5.7%
Yukaghirs: 1.2%
other ethnicities: 6.1%

Economy 
The main industries are gold mining, reindeer herding, fishing, and fur trade. There are deposits of gold, tin, tungsten, mercury, lead, zinc, and brown coal.

Inhabited localities

Divisional source:

*Administrative centers are shown in bold

References

Notes

Sources

External links
Легенды северного края. Шаман Байдарым.   (Legends of Baydarym, a famous Ust-Yansky shaman) 

Districts of the Sakha Republic
Laptev Sea